Budy Michałowskie may refer to:

Budy Michałowskie, Grodzisk Mazowiecki County
Budy Michałowskie, Grójec County